The 2009 Women's European Volleyball League was the first edition of the annual women's volleyball tournament, played by eight European countries from May 22 to June 28, 2009. The final Four was held in Kayseri, Turkey from July 11 to July 12.

Competing nations

League round

Pool A

|}

Leg 1

|}

Leg 2

|}

Leg 3

|}

Leg 4

|}

Leg 5

|}

Leg 6

|}

Pool B

|}

Leg 1

|}

Leg 2

|}

Leg 3

|}

Leg 4

|}

Leg 5

|}

Leg 6

|}

Final four
Qualified teams
, as host

Semifinals

|}

Bronze medal match

|}

Gold Medal match

|}

Final ranking

Individual awards

Most Valuable Player:

Best Spiker:

Best Blocker:

Best Server:

Best Libero:

Best Setter:

Best Scorer:

References
 CEV Results

European Volleyball League
European Volleyball League
Women's European Volleyball League
League 2009
Sport in Kayseri